Choplifter (stylized as Choplifter!) is military themed scrolling shooter developed by Dan Gorlin for the  Apple II and published by Broderbund in 1982. It was ported to the Atari 8-bit family the same year and also to the VIC-20, Commodore 64, Atari 5200 (released in February 1984), ColecoVision, MSX, and Thomson computers.

In 1985, Sega released a coin-operated arcade remake, which in turn was ported to the Master System and Famicom in 1986. Choplifter is one of the few games that first appeared on a home system and was ported to the arcades. Graphically enhanced versions for the Atari 8-bit family and Atari 7800 were also published in 1988 by Atari Corporation.

Gameplay

In Choplifter, the player assumes the role of a combat helicopter pilot. The player attempts to save hostages being held in barracks in territory ruled by the evil Bungeling Empire. The player must collect the hostages (described in the backstory as "delegates to the United Nations Conference on Peace and Child Rearing") and transport them safely to the nearby U.S. Postal Service building, all the while fighting off hostile tanks and other enemy combatants. According to the backstory, the helicopter parts were smuggled into the country, disguised as a "mail-sorting machine".

The helicopter can face three directions: left, right, or forward (facing the player).  It may shoot at enemies in any of these directions and need not fly in the same direction it is facing. The forward-facing mode is used primarily to shoot tanks. The player must be careful to protect the hostages from enemy fire as well as avoid hitting the hostages with his own fire.

The player rescues the prisoners by first shooting one of the hostage buildings to release them, landing to allow the prisoners to board the sortie, and returning them to the player's starting point.  Each of the four buildings holds 16 hostages, and only 16 passengers can be carried at a time, so several trips must be made. When the chopper is full, no more hostages will attempt to board; they will wave the helicopter off and wait for its return. Usually, each trip back is riskier than the last, since the enemy is alerted and has deployed a counter-attack.

If the player lands directly on top of a hostage, or completely blocks the building exit, the hostages will be killed. In the Apple II and Atari 7800 versions, hostages also die if the vehicle is not landed correctly (it is slightly tilted), being crushed as they attempt to board the chopper.  While grounded, the helicopter may be attacked by enemy tanks, which it can shoot at only by returning to the air. Also, the enemy scrambles jet fighters which can attack the vehicle in the air with air-to-air missiles or on the ground with bombs.

Development
Coming off a stint working for the Rand Corporation, Dan Gorlin initially developed Choplifter using an Apple II loaned to him by his grandfather. At first Gorlin imagined Choplifter as a 3D game, but switched to a traditional 2D game environment due to technical limitations.

The game was developed in six months. After Gorlin began experimenting with animating a helicopter on the Apple II, he added scenery, tanks, and planes, with the hostages added last. He stated that, as a story developed, "movie camera techniques seemed appropriate", including the final message "The End" instead of "Game Over". Gorlin's first demonstration to Broderbund was "too realistic, too much a helicopter simulation", and the company helped him make it easier to fly. The concept of rescuing hostages came about after Gorlin learned about Defender, in which the player must protect people on the ground. Although the Iran hostage crisis ended the year before the game was released, Gorlin said "the tie-in with current events was something that never really crossed my mind until we published".

Gorlin would later revisit the 3D concept in a failed attempt to remake the game in the 1990s.

Reception
Debuting in May 1982, the game sold 9,000 copies by June, appearing on Computer Gaming Worlds list of top sellers. II Computing listed Choplifter seventh on the magazine's list of top Apple II games as of late 1985, based on sales and market-share data.

In Japan, Game Machine listed Sega's arcade version of Choplifter in the November 1, 1985, issue as being the most successful table arcade unit on the bi-weekly chart. After being dethroned by Taito's The Legend of Kage on November 15, Choplifter returned to the top of the chart on December 1, 1985.

Reviews
Softline in 1982 called the game "what may well be the first Interactive Computer-Assisted Animated Movie. A fusion of arcade gaming, simulation, and filmic visual aesthetics, Choplifter is destined to occupy a place in the software Hall of Fame". The magazine praised the animation and the helicopter's "subtle flight control", and concluded that seeing the hostages' "hope and excitement, their faith in you" made the game "hard to play. It hurts to see one of those lively people killed". In 1983 its readers named Choplifter fourth on the magazine's Top Thirty list of Atari 8-bit programs by popularity. BYTE called Choplifter "great fun". Computer Gaming World, Creative Computing Video & Arcade Games, and The Commodore 64 Home Companion praised the graphics and animation, the latter stating that "the little captives running across the desert almost seem alive".

The Apple II version of the game received a Certificate of Merit in the category of "Best Computer Audiovisual Effects" at the 4th annual Arkie Awards, and shortly afterward Billboard named it Computer Game of the Year. The Addison-Wesley Book of Atari Software 1984 gave the game an overall A+ rating, calling it "a masterpiece". The book concluded that "the concept, graphics, and animation make this a delightful game".

Console XS magazine reviewed the Sega Master System version, giving it an 85% score. Computer and Video Games magazine reviewed the Master System version in 1989, giving it an 87% score. They also reviewed the ColecoVision and Atari 7800 versions, giving them 81% and 84% scores, respectively.

Legacy
Choplifter II, subtitled "Rescue Survive", was released for the Game Boy in 1991, then remade for both the Game Boy and Game Gear as Choplifter III in 1994. An unrelated Choplifter III was released for Super NES.

In late 1997 it was reported that Gorlin and his development team, Ariok Entertainment, were working on a Choplifter game for IBM PC compatibles which would be in 3D and have multiplayer functionality. The game was never released.

Sega released a pair of spiritual successors without the Choplifter brand:
Air Rescue (1991) for the Sega System 32 arcade hardware is a first-person, pseudo-3D take on the concept. 
Air Rescue (1992) for Master System more closely resembles 2D Choplifter, but has stages that scroll in all directions.

Programmer Will Botti cited Choplifter as a major inspiration for his 1996 game Black Dawn.

In 2004, Xicat Interactive published ChopLifter: Crisis Shield only in Europe.

inXile Entertainment released Choplifter HD for Xbox Live Arcade, PlayStation Network, and Microsoft Windows on January 11, 2012, and Ouya in August 2013.

References

External links

1982 video games
Apple II games
Arcade video games
Atari 5200 games
Atari 7800 games
Atari 8-bit family games
Broderbund games
ColecoVision games
Commodore 64 games
VIC-20 games
FM-7 games
Helicopter video games
Horizontally scrolling shooters
Jaleco games
Master System games
MSX games
NEC PC-6001 games
NEC PC-8801 games
NEC PC-9801 games
Nintendo Entertainment System games
Sega arcade games
Sega video games
Sega System 1 games
SG-1000 games
Sharp X1 games
Tose (company) games
Video games developed in the United States
Single-player video games
Ariolasoft games